Boesenbergia maxwellii is a plant species in the family Zingiberaceae and tribe Zingibereae; its native range is in Indo-China from Myanmar to Laos.

Description
The rhizome is  small and approximately spherical,  in diameter, with numerous cylindrical tuberous roots. Its leaves are simple and alternate: dimension 300-500 x 150-250 mm. The flowers are white with a light labellum and dark pink- purple, sometimes with an orange base. Flowering (in Thailand) is in June–August.

References

External links

 POWO
 IPNI

Zingiberoideae
Flora of Indo-China